Jesse D. Goins is an American film and television character actor. He is best known for his role in the 1980s television series The Greatest American Hero as Cyler Johnson.

Goins' career in the film industry includes a role in the 1984 comedy movie Up the Creek as a soldier named Brown. However, his most famous film role is that of Joe Cox, a member of Clarence Boddicker's gang in the 1987 classic science fiction movie RoboCop and sequel archive footage RoboCop 3. His most recent role was in the 2009 movie The Ugly Truth.

Apart from The Greatest American Hero, Goins has made many guest appearances on television shows over the past three decades. These include "Benson", Taxi, Diff'rent Strokes, Desperate Housewives, Buck Rogers in the 25th Century, Boy Meets World, Hill Street Blues, The A-Team, Cold Case, ER, Seinfeld, Boston Legal and Agents of S.H.I.E.L.D..

Filmography

External links

American male film actors
African-American male actors
American male television actors